Taberner is a Catalan surname. Notable people with the surname or a variant include:

 Alfonso Sánchez-Tabernero (born 1961), President of the University of Navarra
 Annette Taberner (born 1973), Cuban-American neuroscientist
 Carlos Taberner (born 1997), Spanish tennis player
 Danny Taberner (born 1993), English footballer
 Javier Martínez Tabernero (born 1997), Spanish footballer
 Marc Serramitja Taberner (born 1990), Spanish footballer
 Matt Taberner (born 1993), Australian footballer
 Ramon Bech Taberner (1918–1995), Spanish Catalan writer and journalist

References

Catalan-language surnames